The 67th Avenue station is a local station on the IND Queens Boulevard Line of the New York City Subway. Located at the intersection of 67th Avenue and Queens Boulevard in Forest Hills, Queens, it is served by the M train on weekdays, the R train at all times except nights, and the E and F trains during late nights.

History 
The Queens Boulevard Line was one of the first lines built by the city-owned Independent Subway System (IND), and stretches between the IND Eighth Avenue Line in Manhattan and 179th Street and Hillside Avenue in Jamaica, Queens. The Queens Boulevard Line was in part financed by a Public Works Administration (PWA) loan and grant of $25,000,000.

On February 5, 1962, the 67th Drive entrance to the station and a change booth opened. The entrance included three low turnstiles and two high exit turnstiles. This entrance has been built along with the rest of the station, but had not been opened until this point because the station's ridership had not warranted it.

Under the 2015–2019 Metropolitan Transportation Authority Capital Program, the station, along with thirty other New York City Subway stations, was scheduled to undergo a complete overhaul. This station would have been entirely closed for up to 6 months. Updates would have included cellular service, Wi-Fi, charging stations, improved signage, and improved station lighting. However, these renovations are being deferred until the 2020–2024 Capital Program due to a lack of funding.

Station layout 

There are four tracks and two side platforms; the two center express tracks are used by the E and F trains at all times except late nights. Black columns separate them from the local tracks, some of which have a "67TH AVE" sign on them in black lettering on a white background.

Both platform walls have a Medium Powder Blue trim line with a black border and mosaic name tablets reading "67TH AVE." in white sans-serif lettering on a black background and matching blue border. Small tile captions reading "67TH AVE" in white lettering on black run below the trim line, and directional signs in the same style are present below some of the name tablets. Dark blue I-beam columns run along both platforms for their entire length with alternating ones having the standard black name plate in white lettering.

Exits
The station has a full length mezzanine, which also have dark blue I-beam columns, above the platforms. There are six staircases to each platform and the fare control areas are at either ends. The full-time one is at the west (railroad south) end. It has a turnstile bank, token booth, and two street stairs to either eastern corner of Queens Boulevard and 67th Avenue. The station's other fare control area at the east (railroad north) end is un-staffed, containing full height turnstiles, no booth, and two street stairs to either eastern corner of Queens Boulevard and 67th Drive.

References

External links 

 
 Station Reporter — R Train
 Station Reporter — M Train
 The Subway Nut — 67th Avenue Pictures 
 67th Avenue entrance from Google Maps Street View
 67th Drive entrance from Google Maps Street View
 Platforms from Google Maps Street View

IND Queens Boulevard Line stations
New York City Subway stations in Queens, New York
Railway stations in the United States opened in 1936
1936 establishments in New York City